Tephrosia externaria is a moth of the family Geometridae first described by Francis Walker in 1866. It is known from Australia.

References

Boarmiini